Chernoochene Glacier is the 5 km long and 2 km wide glacier on the Oscar II Coast, Graham Land in Antarctica, situated in the southeast foothills of Forbidden Plateau, south of Jorum Glacier and northeast of Crane Glacier.  It is draining southeastwards to flow into Spillane Fjord west of Mount Birks.

The feature is named after the settlement of Chernoochene in southern Bulgaria.

Location
British mapping in 1974.

See also
 List of glaciers in the Antarctic
 Glaciology

Maps
 Antarctic Digital Database (ADD). Scale 1:250000 topographic map of Antarctica. Scientific Committee on Antarctic Research (SCAR). Since 1993, regularly upgraded and updated.

References
 Chernoochene Glacier SCAR Composite Antarctic Gazetteer
 Bulgarian Antarctic Gazetteer Antarctic Place-names Commission (Bulgarian)
 Basic data (English)

External links
 Chernoochene Glacier. Copernix satellite image

Glaciers of Oscar II Coast
Bulgaria and the Antarctic